Ruben A. Gotay (born December 25, 1982) is a Puerto Rican former professional baseball infielder. He played in Major League Baseball (MLB) from 2004 to 2008 with the Kansas City Royals, New York Mets and Atlanta Braves. He is currently a coach for the Clearwater Threshers.

Professional career

Kansas City Royals
Gotay made his major league debut with the Kansas City Royals on August 4, when they played the Chicago White Sox. He went 1-for-3 and got his first major league hit off José Contreras. Gotay played in 44 games for the Royals in 2004. He hit .270 with one home run and 16 RBI. In , Gotay made the Royals' opening day roster and played in 86 major league games. He batted .227 with five home runs and 29 RBI.

Gotay spent the entire  season in the minor leagues.

New York Mets

He was traded to the New York Mets for prospect Jeff Keppinger on July 19, 2006.

Gotay was designated for assignment by the Mets to make room on the 40-man roster for Chan Ho Park in February .

Gotay cleared waivers and was assigned outright to the New Orleans Zephyrs of the Pacific Coast League on February 16, 2007 but was brought back to the major league club on April 30, 2007, after an injury to José Valentín. On May 9, 2007, Gotay hit his first home run as a Met off San Francisco Giants starting pitcher Matt Morris, the ball barely clearing the high right field wall at AT&T Park. On March 27, Gotay was placed on waivers by the Mets.

Atlanta Braves

Gotay was claimed off waivers from the Mets on March 28, 2008, and hit his first home run for Atlanta on June 21. Gotay occasionally pinch hit, but rarely started for the Braves.

Pittsburgh Pirates
In February , Gotay signed a minor league contract with the Pittsburgh Pirates.

Arizona Diamondbacks
On April 4, 2009, Gotay's contract was sold to the Arizona Diamondbacks and was assigned to Triple-A Reno. In November 2009 Gotay Filed For Free Agency.

St. Louis Cardinals
On November 30, 2009, Gotay signed a minor league contract with the St. Louis Cardinals with an invitation to Spring training.

Florida Marlins
On December 2, 2010, Gotay signed a minor league contract with the Florida Marlins. He was later released by the Florida Marlins.

Return to Atlanta
Gotay signed a minor league contract with the Atlanta Braves on June 19, 2011.

Toronto Blue Jays
Gotay was signed by the Toronto Blue Jays on March 14, 2012.

Cincinnati Reds
Gotay signed a minor league deal with the Cincinnati Reds on December 18, 2013. He became a free agent after the 2014 season.

Saraperos de Saltillo
On April 3, 2015, Gotay signed with the Saraperos de Saltillo of the Mexican Baseball League. He was released on April 16, 2015. He signed with them again on April 1, 2016. He was released on April 7, 2016.

Long Island Ducks
On May 16, 2016, Gotay signed with the Long Island Ducks of the Atlantic League of Professional Baseball. He became a free agent after the 2016 season. He resigned on June 10, 2017.

Coaching career
The Philadelphia Phillies has hired him to be coach at their Single High A team Clearwater for 2018 season.

Personal
His uncle is former major leaguer Julio Gotay. Gotay played little league in Fajardo Puerto Rico where his father Rubén Gotay was the head coach of the Pumas.

References

External links

1982 births
2006 World Baseball Classic players
Living people
Atenienses de Manatí (baseball) players
Atlanta Braves players
Burlington Bees players
Gigantes de Carolina players
Gulf Coast Royals players
Gwinnett Braves players
Indios de Mayagüez players
Kansas City Royals players
Las Vegas 51s players
Liga de Béisbol Profesional Roberto Clemente infielders
Long Island Ducks players
Louisville Bats players
Major League Baseball players from Puerto Rico
Major League Baseball second basemen
Major League Baseball shortstops
Major League Baseball third basemen
Memphis Redbirds players
Mexican League baseball first basemen
Mexican League baseball second basemen
Mexican League baseball third basemen
Minor league baseball coaches
Navegantes del Magallanes players
Puerto Rican expatriate baseball players in Venezuela
New Orleans Zephyrs players
New York Mets players
Norfolk Tides players
Omaha Royals players
People from Río Piedras, Puerto Rico
Puerto Rican expatriate baseball players in Mexico
Reno Aces players
Richmond Braves players
Saraperos de Saltillo players
Senadores de San Juan players
Springfield Cardinals players
Wichita Wranglers players
Wilmington Blue Rocks players
Criollos de Caguas players
Tiburones de Aguadilla players